Innyaly (İnñeli) is a rural locality (a selo) in Tolonsky Rural Okrug of Lensky District in the Sakha Republic, Russia, located  from Lensk, the administrative center of the district and  from Tolon, the administrative center of the rural okrug. Its population as of the 2002 Census was 169.

References

Notes

Sources
Official website of the Sakha Republic. Registry of the Administrative-Territorial Divisions of the Sakha Republic. Lensky District. 

Rural localities in Lensky District, Sakha Republic